Shaunzinski Toronnie Gortman (born December 7, 1979) is a former professional women's basketball player for the WNBA. Born in Columbia, South Carolina, she was the ninth pick in the 2002 WNBA draft.

South Carolina statistics
Source

WNBA career statistics

Regular season

|-
| align="left" | 2002
| align="left" | Minnesota
| 29 || 2 || 12.7 || .361 || .326 || .778 || 2.1 || 0.7 || 0.4 || 0.2 || 0.9 || 3.1
|-
| align="left" | 2003
| align="left" | Minnesota
| 24 || 0 || 8.3 || .438 || .263 || .750 || 1.3 || 0.6 || 0.4 || 0.0 || 0.8 || 2.1
|-
| align="left" | 2004
| align="left" | Washington
| 4 || 0 || 6.0 || .000 || .000 || .000 || 1.0 || 0.5 || 0.0 || 0.3 || 0.5 || 0.0
|-
| align="left" | 2006
| align="left" | Seattle
| 20 || 0 || 13.2 || .364 || .167 || .778 || 2.4 || 0.9 || 0.6' || 0.1 || 1.3 || 2.8
|-
| align="left" | Career
| align="left" | 4 years, 3 teams
| 77 || 2 || 11.1 || .380 || .284 || .774 || 1.9 || 0.7 || 0.4 || 0.1 || 0.9 || 2.6

Playoffs

|-
| align="left" | 2004
| align="left" | Washington
| 1 || 0 || 2.0 || .000 || .000 || .000 || 0.0 || 0.0 || 0.0 || 0.0 || 0.0 || 0.0
|-
| align="left" | Career
| align="left" | 1 year, 1 team
| 1 || 0 || 2.0 || .000 || .000 || .000 || 0.0 || 0.0 || 0.0 || 0.0 || 0.0 || 0.0

Vital statistics
Position: Guard
Height: 5 ft 10 in
College: University of South Carolina
Team(s): Minnesota Lynx, Washington Mystics, Seattle Storm

References

External links
 Interview with Gortman when she was a senior at the University of South Carolina

1979 births
Living people
American women's basketball players
Basketball players from Columbia, South Carolina
Minnesota Lynx players
Seattle Storm players
South Carolina Gamecocks women's basketball players
Washington Mystics players